The Garfield Weston Foundation is a grant-giving charity based in the United Kingdom. It was established in 1958 by Canadian businessman W. Garfield Weston (1898–1978), who during his lifetime contributed to numerous humanitarian causes, both personally and through his companies. His philanthropic works continue through the Garfield Weston Foundation in London and the Weston Family Foundation in Toronto, Ontario, Canada.

The Garfield Weston Foundation is one of the largest charitable foundations in the world, with assets of £9.7billion at 5 April 2017, of which a majority was attributed to the foundation's majority holding in Wittington Investments.

Since Sir Guy Weston's appointment as chairman, the Garfield Weston Foundation has become the largest family grant-making foundation in the UK, with total grants exceeding £1billion.

Projects 
The Garfield Weston Foundation gave Oxford University £25million for the refurbishment of the New Library (built originally in the 1930s as part of the Bodleian Library), which re-opened to the public in March 2015 as the Weston Library.

The foundation has given grants to a number of schools, including St Michael's Primary School and Brackenbury Primary School for new classrooms and outdoor play areas for sport, and is a sponsor of Baker Dearing Educational Trust which promotes university technical colleges.

In 2019 the foundation gave £5million towards the £31million restoration of the walled garden at RHS Bridgewater in Salford, Greater Manchester.

Controversies over political donations 
In 2010, the Charity Commission found that between 1993 and 2004 the charity had given donations to the UK Conservative Party that totalled £900,000, which were in breach of UK charity law; as were similar donations to the economically liberal think tank the Centre for Policy Studies, and to Eurosceptic European political lobby groups such as the European Foundation and the Labour Euro-Safeguards Campaign.

Tax avoidance controversy 
In 2011, companies owned by Wittington Investments were targeted over tax avoidance by the protest group UK Uncut. Private Eye linked the Garfield Weston Foundation's political donations with the Conservative Party's decision to grant tax breaks for the kind of offshore arrangements used in the tax avoidance.

See also 
 Garfield Weston Merit Scholarships for Colleges
 Weston family

References

External links 
 
 

Foundations based in the United Kingdom
Foundation